The 1947 Cork Senior Hurling Championship was the 59th staging of the Cork Senior Hurling Championship since its establishment by the Cork County Board in 1887. The draw for the opening round fixtures was made at the Cork Convention on 26 January 1947. The championship began on 6 April 1947 and ended on 19 October 1947.

St. Finbarr's entered the championship as the defending champions.

On 19 October 1947, St. Finbarr's won the championship following a 4-6 to 4-4 defeat of Sarsfields in the final. This was their 14th championship title overall and their second title in succession.

Team changes

To Championship

Promoted to the Cork Senior Hurling Championship
 Carrigtwohill (drawn to play Imokilly in the first round but withdrew before the championship started and replaced by University College Cork)

From Championship

Withdrew from the Cork Senior Hurling Championship
 Army

Results

First round

Second round

Imokilly received a bye in this round.

Semi-finals

Final

Championship statistics

Top scorers

Top scorers overall

Top scorers in a single game

Miscellaneous

 On 17 August 1947, Sarsfields recorded their first ever championship victory over Glen Rovers.

References

Cork Senior Hurling Championship
Cork Senior Hurling Championship